The Power of Pussy is the third studio album by Bongwater, released in 1990 by Shimmy Disc. The album contains major college radio hits such as the title track, as well as favorites such as "Nick Cave Dolls" and "Folk Song," with covers of Dudley Moore's "Bedazzled" and "Kisses Sweeter Than Wine" by The Weavers. In 1998, it was remastered by Alan Douches and Kramer for its inclusion in Box of Bongwater set.

Track listing

Personnel 
Adapted from The Power of Pussy liner notes.

Bongwater
 Kramer – vocals, instruments, engineering, production
 David Licht – drums, percussion
 Ann Magnuson – vocals
 Dave Rick – guitar

Production and additional personnel
 Tseng Kwong Chi – photography
 Sheena Dupuis – design
 Michael Macioce – photography
 Ron Paul – assistant engineer
 Fred Schneider – vocals (A1)
 Peter Stampfel – banjo (A4)

Release history

References

External links 
 

1990 albums
Albums produced by Kramer (musician)
Bongwater (band) albums
Shimmy Disc albums